The Man of Newmarket is a 1678 comedy play by the English writer Edward Howard. It was first staged at the Theatre Royal, Drury Lane by the King's Company.

The original cast featured John Wiltshire as  Passal, Nicholas Burt as Maldrin, Martin Powell as Nonsuch, Joseph Haines as Whiffler, Thomas Clark as  Swiftspur, Cardell Goodman as  Trainsted, Philip Griffin as  Bowser, Carey Perin as Plodwell, Michael Mohun as Breakbond, John Coysh as Pricknote, Mary Corbett as Clevly and Katherine Corey as Quickthridt.

References

Bibliography
 Nicoll, Allardyce. History of English Drama, 1660-1900: Volume 1, Restoration Drama, 1660-1700. Cambridge University Press, 1952.
 Van Lennep, W. The London Stage, 1660-1800: Volume One, 1660-1700. Southern Illinois University Press, 1960.

1678 plays
West End plays
Plays by Edward Howard
Restoration comedy